Rodolfo de Zorzi (27 July 1921 – 12 January 1995) was an Argentine footballer. He played in seven matches for the Argentina national football team in 1945. He was also part of Argentina's squad for the 1945 South American Championship.

References

External links
 

1921 births
1995 deaths
Argentine footballers
Argentina international footballers
Association football defenders
Rosario Central footballers
Boca Juniors footballers
Club Atlético Platense footballers